The Latin Grammy Award for Best Alternative Song is an honor presented annually at the Latin Grammy Awards, a ceremony that recognizes excellence and creates a wider awareness of cultural diversity and contributions of Latin recording artists in the United States and internationally. The award is reserved to the songwriters of a new song containing at least 51% of the lyrics in Spanish. Instrumental recordings or cover songs are not eligible.

The award has been presented to songwriters originating from France, Mexico, Colombia and Puerto Rico. It was first earned by French musician Manu Chao for the song "Me Llaman Calle" in 2007. The band members of Café Tacvba, Calle 13 and Carla Morrison are the only songwriters to have received this award more than once.

Recipients

2000s

2010s

2020s

 Each year is linked to the article about the Latin Grammy Awards held that year.
 The performing artist is only listed but does not receive the award.
 Showing the name of the songwriter(s), the nominated song and in parentheses the performer's name(s).

See also
Latin Grammy Award for Best Alternative Music Album

References

External links
Official site of the Latin Grammy Awards

 
Alternative Song
Song awards
Songwriting awards